The 1964–65 Liga Gimel season saw 162 clubs competing in 14 regional divisions for promotion to Liga Bet.

Hapoel Hatzor, Hapoel Kafr Yasif, Maccabi Kiryat Yam, Hapoel Sde Nahum, Beitar Tirat HaCarmel, Hapoel Binyamina, Hapoel HaSharon HaTzfoni, Hapoel Sha'ariya, Elite Ramat Gan, Beitar Holon, Maccabi Kiryat Malakhi, Hapoel Beit Shemesh, Beitar Ashkelon and Hapoel Yeruham won their regional divisions and qualified for the Promotion play-offs.

At the Promotion play-offs, Hapoel Sde Nahum, Hapoel Binyamina, Maccabi Kiryat Yam and Beitar Tirat HaCarmel were promoted to Liga Bet from the North play-offs, whilst Hapoel Sha'ariya, Hapoel Beit Shemesh, Elite Ramat Gan and Beitar Holon were promoted to Liga Bet from the South play-offs.

Eastern Galilee Division

Western Galilee Division

Bay Division

Valleys Division

Haifa Division

Samaria Division

Netanya Division

Sharon Division

Tel Aviv Division

Jaffa Division

Central Division

Jerusalem Division

South Division

Negev Division

Promotion play-offs

North play-offs

South play-offs

See also
1964–65 Liga Leumit
1964–65 Liga Alef
1964–65 Liga Bet

References
14 Teams battled for 8 promotion tickets (Page 3) Moshe Kashtan, Hadshot HaSport, 19 July 1965, archive.football.co.il 
Football teams of Beitar Holon and Beitar Tirat HaCarmel promoted to Liga Bet Heruth, 3 August 1965, Historical Jewish Press 

Liga Gimel seasons
4